A list of British films released in 2002.

See also
 2002 in film
 2002 in British music
 2002 in British radio
 2002 in British television
 2002 in the United Kingdom
 List of 2002 box office number-one films in the United Kingdom

References

External links

2001
Films
British